Takeover Entertainment was a British entertainment company. The organization operates an independent record label, talent agency, a music production company, as well as its own music publishing house. The company was founded in 2006 and is run by Kwasi Danquah III (known by his pseudonym Tinchy Stryder), Archie Lamb and Jack Foster. It specializes in producing R&B, hip hop and electronic music. It was dissolved in October 2013
 
The first person to be signed to Takeover Entertainment was English rapper and entrepreneur Tinchy Stryder. Success followed by Stryder becoming the biggest selling UK male artist of 2009 with his second studio album, Catch 22, which spawned hits, including "Take Me Back", and #1's "Never Leave You", and the N-Dubz collaboration "Number 1".

History
The company was formed on Thursday 9 February 2006 by Archie Lamb and Jack Foster. Then part-time promoters, the duo put on nightclubs in the United Kingdom that featured artists including Roll Deep and Lethal Bizzle. Upon meeting Danquah in 2006 they branched out into management, and signed him to a record deal. The Star in the Hood clothing company was founded in the same year.

In 2008 Takeover Entertainment, signed a joint venture with EMI Music Publishing to create the global music publishing company Takeover/Cloud 9, and enabled Takeover Entertainment to sign artists and songwriters and develop the signed artists and songwriters in partnership with EMI.

In 2010 Shawn "Jay-Z" Carter and Roc Nation signed a joint venture deal with Takeover Entertainment to create a European record label and entertainment company. The new company was named Takeover Roc Nation. Takeover Roc Nation is currently based in the United Kingdom, and distributes its record releases through Sony Music and partners with Live Nation for all other aspects of the business.

People

Concerts and tours
Rollercoaster Tour, November 2011 (United Kingdom)
The Rockstar Tour, December 2011 (United Kingdom)
Bad Intentions Tour, 2012

Discography

2011 Studio album single(s)

2012 Studio album single(s)

Upcoming studio album(s)

References

External links
 Contact page — Takeover Entertainment Limited — Contact page 
  Tinchy Stryder: Rapping with the Lib Dems collected news and commentary at The Guardian

 
2006 establishments in the United Kingdom
British independent record labels
Electronic dance music record labels
Hip hop record labels
Music production companies
Music publishing companies of the United Kingdom
Publishing companies established in 2006
Soul music record labels
Synth-pop record labels
Talent agencies
Takeover Group